The American Chamber of Commerce in Shanghai is an organization that promotes American businesses in China through its main offices in Shanghai. AmCham Shanghai was founded in 1915 as the third American Chamber of Commerce established outside the United States, and now has 3,000 members from 1,500 companies. Its membership ranges from large corporations to small startups and includes companies from diverse industries. As a non-profit, non-partisan business organization, AmCham Shanghai promotes free trade, open markets, private enterprise and the unrestricted flow of information.

Structure
AmCham is a chamber of commerce governed by a Board of Governors and represented by a public-facing President.

Board of Governors
The AmCham Shanghai Board of Governors is responsible for the policymaking of the organization and the general direction of the Chamber's activities. The Board also has a fiduciary responsibility. The 11 Governors are elected by voting members for staggered, two-year terms. Each fall approximately one half of the Board stands for election at the Annual General Meeting. The Board has four officers: a Chair, two Vice Chairs and a Treasurer. Two Honorary Governors are also appointed yearly from the U.S. Consulate General in Shanghai.

President
The Chamber’s current President is Ker Gibbs. He assumed his position in January 2019.

Publications

AmCham Shanghai publications include Insight magazine, the annual China Business Report (CBR) and Viewpoint advocacy and policy documents. Video content includes “On China,” a series of interviews with leading China experts from both academia and business. AmCham also produce a bi-weekly podcast, “China Voices,” which covers a range of topics, including the economy, small business, trade and economic trends.

CBR – The China Business Report (CBR) is an annual publication based on the results of AmCham’s annual business sentiment survey. The survey questions company heads about business performance, forecast and strategy, the regulatory and operational environment, regional investment, and other areas pertinent to the business environment at the time of the survey. These have included trade policy, trade tensions, local competition and the impact of China’s digital transformation on business.

The CBR has been quoted by the AFP, Bloomberg, CNBC, the Financial Times , the New York Times, Reuters, the Wall Street Journal  and many other esteemed publications.

Insight– Published six times a year, Insight is the member magazine of the Chamber. The journal includes Features, Policy and Technology sections, as well as member news. The annual January/February issue is a policy special, which includes contributions from and/or interviews with luminaries in the fields of Chinese economics, Chinese politics and U.S.-China relations. Featured experts include: Kerry Brown (King’s College London), Derek Scissors (American Enterprise Institute), Victor Shih (UCSD), Susan Shirk (UCSD), Steve Tsang  (SOAS), Wang Yong (Peking University), Wu XinBo (Fudan University) and Rod Wye (Chatham House).

Membership

AmCham Shanghai’s membership includes over 3,000 total members, including almost 1,500 corporate members. Members come from diverse backgrounds and missions, all of which intersect with China. AmCham hosts 20 industry committees for members. Each committee is advised by business leaders who identify key issues in their industries and drive year-round programming. Events include small-scale roundtables, speaker series, and cross-industry conferences.

Membership services and programs

A range of benefits are available to members; specific benefits may vary with type and classification of membership. Services include professional development, visa programs, medical insurance and tax filing guidance, as well as access to a wide variety of events and publications. The Chamber facilitates business support, market access, policy advocacy, and relationship-building activities. Select Chamber programs are detailed below.

U.S. Corporate Visa Program (CVP) 
AmCham’s CVP facilitates U.S. visas for participating Corporate Member companies’ direct employees and their family members. In cooperation with the U.S. Consulate General Shanghai, the program provides simplified document review, expedited visa appointment interviews, access to all U.S. non-immigration visa types, and an excellent approval rate for applicants.

Government Policy Support Program (GPS) 
The GPS Program provides members with the latest policy developments and insight into how these translate into commercial opportunities and challenges for companies.

Corporate Social Responsibility (CSR) 
AmCham’s CSR  activities provide member companies with the latest information on corporate social responsibility trends and access to influential CSR organizations. AmCham Shanghai’s CSR program includes the Business Council for Sustainability, CSR Conference and Awards and the annual Charity Gala. Since 2002, AmCham Shanghai’s CSR initiatives have led to nearly 12 million RMB in donations to local charities.

CEO Advisory Series 
The CEO Advisory Series is offered to select CEOs of leading enterprises in China. The program includes quarterly programming, a monthly newsletter, and talk write-ups. CEO members can choose to attend up to 20 curated programs per year.

Trade & Investment Center (TIC) 
The TIC is a two-way hub of resources and referrals for U.S. companies interested in the China market and a gateway to the United States for Chinese companies. The TIC platform is intended for companies of all sizes.

Chapters
The Chamber is headquartered in Shanghai and includes branches in Suzhou, Nanjing, Hangzhou and California.  The Suzhou Center was founded in 2012 and serves the vibrant manufacturing community in Suzhou and Suzhou Industrial Park. Founded in 2016, the Nanjing Center supports member companies in Jiangsu with a special focus on Nanjing-based members. In 2019, AmCham Shanghai launched offices in Hangzhou and San Francisco, California. The Hangzhou office will serve the U.S.-focused business community in Zhejiang. The San Francisco office provides programming and support for American companies interested in China.

History

Founding

The American Chamber of Commerce in Shanghai was founded on June 9, 1915, at Shanghai’s Palace Hotel. Forty-five American businessmen gathered to establish “The American Chamber of Commerce of China” and appointed a provisional committee of ten individuals to draft a constitution and bylaws. J.H. McMichael was named chairman of the new chamber’s provisional committee, together with nine other members, including representatives from American Steel, Standard Oil, British American Tobacco, R.H. Macy & Co., Singer Sewing and Dollar Shipping.

The Chamber elected its first officers and established bylaws on August 18, 1915. J.H. McMichael was the Chamber’s first president and J.W. Gallagher of United States Steel was elected vice president. The Chamber was the third American Chamber of Commerce established outside the United States.

Early years

By March 1916 the organization had 32 corporate members, 26 individual members and a bank balance of $2,057.25 USD. By 1919, Chamber membership had grown to 200 members.
 
Harold Dollar (Dollar Shipping) and V.G. Lyman (Standard Oil) led the Chamber from 1922-25 as President and Vice President. The Chamber moved into permanent offices in the Dollar Building on Canton Road and hired a full-time director. 
 
The Shanghai Chamber changed its name on October 19, 1922 to the “American Chamber of Commerce (Shanghai)” and established an umbrella organization based in Shanghai to coordinate the work of all China AmChams called the “Associated American Chambers of Commerce in China.”

Pre-war period

During the period between Japan’s 1937 military actions in China and the U.S. declaration of war on Japan in December 1941, the Chamber continued to operate. One new advocacy issue for the Chamber was to counter trade restrictions imposed by Japan against American trade with China and “Japan’s continued aggression against American rights and interests in China.” As of 1940, the Chamber had a permanent staff of five and 18 special committees. It continued to publish a periodic newsletter called “The Fishbowl,” which reported on comings and goings within the business community. The Chamber offices in the American Club were seized by the Japanese army on December 10, 1941 and all Chamber activities came to a halt.

Post-war chamber

The first post-war gathering of the Chamber took place on September 10, 1945 at the Shanghai YMCA. The Chamber’s constitution was reissued both in 1946 and 1948, in part to comply with registration requirements from the Nationalist government. The language of the mission statement was different from that used in 1915, but the overall objectives were the same: promote bilateral trade, support U.S. companies in China, collect and disseminate useful commercial information, and promote American interests in China. AmCham Shanghai temporarily ended its operations by the end of 1950, as the American business presence in Shanghai had ceased to exist.

Revival

The revival of the Chamber occurred at a time when China’s central government was reassessing the role that Shanghai should play in supporting China’s economic reform and growth.  John McCoy and George Hsu were elected as the first two co-presidents and when Hsu left Shanghai in 1988, Givant was nominated into the role of co-president with John McCoy. The inaugural meeting of the revived organization took place at the Union Building on Yan’an Road in the fall of 1987. The Chamber held its first formal meeting in 1987 at the U.S. Consulate with 35 business community members in attendance. 
  
By 1999, the Chamber had 1,820 members. By 2003, the Chamber had 2,010 members and established another record in 2006 with 3,100 members. Membership broke the 4,000 number during the 2010 Shanghai World Expo, but in recent years, membership size has stabilized in the range of 3,000 members from 1,500 companies. AmCham Shanghai is still one of the largest American chambers outside of the United States. In 2010, the organization took steps to normalize its legal status by creating a wholly foreign-owned enterprise (WFOE) that allows the Chamber to accept online and electronic payments.

References 

American Chambers of commerce
Chambers of commerce in China
Organizations based in Shanghai
American expatriates in Shanghai